Send Me a Lullaby is The Go-Betweens' debut album.  It was released in November 1981 in Australia on Missing Link as an eight-track mini-album.  It was subsequently released in the UK on Rough Trade Records, an independent music record label (Missing Link's UK distributors) in February 1982, as a 12-track album.

Details
The album was recorded at the Richmond Recorders studio in Melbourne in July 1981. The album was engineered and produced by Tony Cohen (The Birthday Party), together with The Go-Betweens. Forster said that Cohen, although having a signature sound, lacked a producer's instinct and the band had to "choose their own songs and arrange them themselves," resulting in many older songs being jettisoned from the album.

In 2002, Circus Records released an expanded CD which included a second disc of twelve bonus tracks of songs recorded by The Go-Betweens around the same time as the album together with a music video for the song, "Your Turn, My Turn".

McLennan later said, "Send Me A Lullaby is to me an inauspicious debut. It's a record that I think if I'd heard - well, it's hard for me to say that, but if I'd heard that and I wasn't in the band, I think my comment would have been 'What the fuck is going on here.' There's great melodies but then there's changes which to this day I can't work out. There's lyrics to this day which I don't understand and when I actually summon up enough courage to get to the microphone, I sound like a choirboy with a mouthful of fruitcake." Forster agreed, saying, "So, no classic first album. But a band has to keep thinking they are writing their own story. This was our way."

Morrison said her drumming on the album had been affected by the experimentation with her previous band Xero. "The trouble was, it had become part of me to do silly things, which is why my drumming is idiosyncratic with the Go-Betweens in many ways. On Send Me A Lullaby there are lots of strange drumbeats, things that a normal drummer wouldn't play," she said.

Melbourne artist Jenny Watson painted the cover of the album. The portraits were later purchased by the Australian National Portrait Gallery. Forster claimed, "She got the three of us with precision, placing us on the album with the touch of a master psychologist." The inner gatefold had pictures of Forster and McLennan's apartments.

Reception
Reviewed in Australian Rolling Stone at the time of release, it was described as reflecting, "the progression from folky naivety of the early songs to a more involved, complex set of emotions, though understatement is still a key feature." The reviewer notes it is an album with, "no, or at least very few, overdubs," and says, "the band have produced a fresh, uncluttered sound that has a live presence to it." The review concludes by saying, "everything's come together just fine."

NME described the album as, "a record of tremendous depth, a mystery to be fathomed." Noting the album's naivety, clumsiness, intelligence, and frailty, the reviewer notes, "Maybe I'm forgetting, but this seems the least fussy, least pompous, most natural and moving music I've yet heard from their part of the planet." Smash Hits called it, "a set of unpolished but appealing songs. Their slight gawkiness would probably be scorned if they were British."

Track listing

Personnel
The Go-Betweens
 Robert Forster – vocals, rhythm guitar
 Grant McLennan – vocals, bass guitar, lead guitar
 Lindy Morrison – drums, vocals
Additional personnel
 Nick Cave – vocals on "After the Fireworks"
 Steve Daly – drums on "I Need Two Heads" and "Stop Before You Say It"
 James Freud – saxophone
 Mick Harvey – piano on "After the Fireworks"
 Rowland S. Howard – guitar on "After the Fireworks"
 Dan Wallace-Crabbe – piano on "World Weary"

References

The Go-Betweens albums
1981 debut albums
Albums produced by Tony Cohen
Rough Trade Records albums